The Honda CMX450 "Rebel" is a motorcycle manufactured by Honda for the model years 1986 and 1987 only. In contrast to the Rebel 250 250cc cruiser, it has a 450cc engine.  The introduction of the Rebel 250 and 450 has been cited as a way for Honda to attract female riders, new to motorcycling. due to the bikes' low seat heights, low center of gravity, and overall ease of handling; However, the September 1985 issue of Motorcyclist magazine, when the Rebel was first introduced, states "by targeting the bike to a young audience, such as those who watch MTV, Honda hopes to attract newcomers and expand the motorcycle market ... Honda is not marketing this motorcycle as a woman's bike".
It has a single disc brake in the front and a drum in the rear. The only gauge is a speedometer that includes gear recommendations based on speed; there is no tachometer. The transmission is a standard down-1st, up-2nd to 6th. The 6th speed acts as an overdrive.

References

CMX450
Motorcycles introduced in 1986
Cruiser motorcycles
Motorcycles powered by straight-twin engines